Gramam (Namma Gramam) is an Indian bilingual film written, directed and produced by actor-producer Mohan Sharma. It was simultaneously made in Malayalam and Tamil languages under the titles Gramam and Namma Gramam, respectively. It stars Nishan, Samvrutha, Nedumudi Venu, Sukumari Nair, Mohan Sharma, Y. G. Mahendraa, Nalini and Fathima Babu. The film, which was well received by critics upon its screening at various film festivals, won two National Film Awards and two Kerala State Film Awards among other laurels. Gramam is the first part of a trilogy on the Palakkad Brahmin community. Set between 1937 and 1947, the film is about a child widow and how she fights societal conventions. The second and third parts of the trilogy will be respectively set between 1947-1962 and 1962–1975. The film got released in Kerala on 10 August 2012. Sukumari received the National award for Best Supporting actress in 2010 for her sensitive portrayal.

Awards
 National Film Awards
 Won - Silver Lotus Award - Best Supporting Actress - Sukumari
 Won - Silver Lotus Award - Best Costume Design - Indrans Jayan
 Kerala State Film Awards
 Best Story - Mohan Sharma
 Best Male Playback Singer - Balamuralikrishna

 Tamil Nadu State Film Awards
Tamil Nadu State Film Award Special Prize for Best Film -Mohan Sharma
Best Editor-B. Lenin

Cast
 Mohan Sharma as Rao Bahadur Mani Swami
 Nishan as Kannan
 Samvrutha as Thulasi
 Sukumari as Amminiyamma/ Paatti
 Nedumudi Venu as Govindankutty Maashu
 Nalini as Kunju Ammaal
 Priya as Nechumu/Lakshmiyamma
 Renuka as Thankam
 Kozhikode Narayanan Nair as Panikkar Jolsyan
 Kalamandalam Radhika as Narayani
 Fathima Babu as Karthyayani
 Y. G. Mahendra as Burma Ambi Swami
 Maya Vishwanath as Bhargavi
 Kripa as Vrinda
 Aneesh G Menon as Kuttan
 Ravi Shankar
 Abhilash

References

External links
 

2012 films
2010s Malayalam-language films
2010s Tamil-language films
Indian drama films
Films featuring a Best Supporting Actress National Film Award-winning performance
Films that won the Best Costume Design National Film Award
2012 multilingual films
Indian multilingual films
Films shot in Palakkad
2012 directorial debut films
2012 drama films